Sergei or Sergey Tereshchenko or Tereschenko may refer to:

Sergey Tereshchenko (1951–2023), Kazakhstani politician 
Sergei Tereshchenko (born 1984), Russian footballer
Sergei Tereschenko (born 1991), Russian ice hockey defenceman

See also 
 Sergey Tereshchenkov (1938–2006), Soviet cyclist